America's Thanksgiving Parade (officially America's Thanksgiving Parade presented by Gardner-White for 2020) is an annual American parade held in downtown Detroit, Michigan each Thanksgiving Day from 9:00 a.m. to 12:00 p.m. EST. The tradition was started in the city in 1924 by the J. L. Hudson Company department store. It shares the title for the second-oldest Thanksgiving parade in the United States with the Macy's Thanksgiving Day Parade in New York City, New York and is four years younger than the 6abc Dunkin' Thanksgiving Day Parade in Philadelphia, Pennsylvania.

History
The idea came from Hudson's display director Charles Wendel after the success of the Canadian Eaton's Santa Claus Parade in Toronto, Ontario. In addition to the usual floats and bands, Wendel obtained large papier-mâché heads similar to those he saw during a recent trip to Europe. The heads are made in Viareggio, Italy, and remain a fixture of the parade to the present.

The parade was suspended in 1943 and 1944 due to material shortages caused by World War II, but Hudson's resumed the event in 1945 and continued sponsorship of the parade until 1979, when the costs became burdensome. It turned the parade over to the Detroit Renaissance Foundation, who produced it for four years. In 1983, Detroit Renaissance transferred control of the parade to the newly created Michigan Thanksgiving Parade Foundation. "America's Thanksgiving Parade" is a registered trademark of the foundation.

In 2020, this parade is modified as the COVID-19 pandemic persists; with no crowds. As of July 2020, the parade organisers still plan on holding the parade in some form, with Gardner-White buying presenting sponsor rights.

Parade details
The parade features a variety of floats, marching bands and balloons, with the climax being the arrival of Santa Claus, who appears at the end to herald the arrival of the Christmas season. Unique to the parade are the Big Head Corps, featuring a large collection of papier-mâché heads, and the Distinguished Clown Corps, which features local corporate and community leaders dressed as clowns. The parade is made possible through the efforts of more than 4,500 volunteers.

Broadcasts
The parade was first broadcast in 1931 on radio station WWJ.

In 1959, the parade came to television on local stations WWJ-TV and WXYZ-TV. The WXYZ program was hosted by ventriloquist and puppeteer Shari Lewis and her sock puppet Lamb Chop and carried nationally on the ABC broadcast network. In 1960, the CBS broadcast network began to air portions of the parade and continued to do so for the next 25 parades. After a brief break in the mid-1980s, CBS returned to cover the parade through 2002 as part of its All-American Thanksgiving Day Parade compilation show. Over the years, several other well-known personalities were commentators for the Detroit parades, including John Amos, Ned Beatty, Kathy Garver, Captain Kangaroo host Bob Keeshan, Linda Lavin, Esther Rolle and Andrew Stevens.

After being broadcast on WWJ, later WDIV, for over 20 years, local coverage switched to WXYZ for several years in the 1980s before returning to NBC-affiliate WDIV in the mid-1990s. It is televised on other stations around Michigan and across the U.S., as well as through Internet television. The coverage of the parade typically includes a preshow featuring a variety of musical acts, often with celebrity performers. The coverage concludes with the Mayor of Detroit giving Santa Claus the key to the city.

Parade route
Since 2014, the parade has started just north of Warren, at Kirby and Woodward Avenue in front of the Detroit Historical Museum and the Park Shelton. You can see the current parade route on The Parade Company's website.

Prior to 2014, since 2006, the parade began at Woodward and Mack Avenues. The parade ends at Congress Street. The Mack to Congress route is the route the first parade followed in 1924. The parade travels toward downtown from Mack Avenue, and after crossing over Interstate 75 I-75), it enters Foxtown, near Detroit's Fox Theatre, the Hockeytown Cafe, and Comerica Park. From Foxtown, the parade passes through Grand Circus Park then into the business district, where it then enters the television coverage area near Grand River and Gratiot avenues. The route was from this route for several years during the construction of Campus Martius Park and the realignment of Woodward Avenue and other adjacent streets. The construction was completed in 2004.

For many years, ending with Hudson's withdrawal in 1979, the parade began at Woodward and Putnam near the Detroit Public Library and ended at Hudson's Marquee near Gratiot Avenue, where Santa alighted his sleigh and received the key to the hearts of children of Detroit from the mayor. In 1979, the route was moved several blocks north, beginning at Antoinette Street and ending at Adams Street, near Grand Circus Park. During this period, Santa alighted on the steps of the Detroit Institute of Arts to be welcomed by the mayor, then remounted to travel the remainder of the parade route.

For a period, the parade route was moved to Second Avenue because electrical wires that powered the Woodward Avenue streetcars posed a hazard to floats and their riders. Streetcars ceased operating on Woodward Avenue in 1956 when the Detroit Department of Street Railways converted to an all-motor-bus fleet.

Parade foundation
The Michigan Thanksgiving Parade Foundation began in 1982 to manage, organize and raise funds for the parade.  In 1990, The Parade Company was founded as a foundation division to oversee operations and marketing activities.

In addition to the parade, The Parade Company assumed responsibility for organizing the annual Windsor-Detroit International Freedom Festival in 1989 and helped to plan Stanley Cup victory parades for the Detroit Red Wings in 1997, 1998, 2002 and 2008.

See also

Culture of Detroit
List of holiday parades

References

External links
 theparade.org, The Parade Company's official website (the marketing and operating division of The Michigan Thanksgiving Parade Foundation, the parade's organiser)
 WDIV Thanksgiving Day Parade page

1924 establishments in Michigan
American Broadcasting Company original programming
American annual television specials
Annual events in Michigan
CBS television specials
Culture of Detroit
Parades in the United States
Recurring events established in 1924
Television in Detroit
Thanksgiving parades
Tourist attractions in Detroit
Festivals established in 1924